Slatkin is a surname. Notable people with the surname include:

Felix Slatkin (1915–1963), American classical violinist and conductor
Harry Slatkin (born 1960), American businessman
Leonard Slatkin (born 1944), American conductor and composer
Daniel Slatkin (born 1994), American film composer
Montgomery Slatkin, American biologist
Nora Slatkin (born 1955), United States Assistant Secretary of the Navy (Research, Development and Acquisitions) and Executive Director of the Central Intelligence Agency
Reed Slatkin (born 1949), American fraudster